Józef Juraszek Ślopek lived in Jeleśnia. He was a pioneer in setting broken, sprained and dislocated bones of both people and animals. 
	
When he was 20 years old he was obliged to join the Austrian Army. At the time Poland was partitioned between Prussia, Russia and Austria, and the area where Jozef lived was occupied by Austria. He did not wish to serve with the occupying army. To avoid having to serve, he put his ring-finger on tree trunk and with one swing of the axe he cut it off clean. He then wrapped his wound with bread mixed with spider cobwebs. In accordance with the rules of the Imperial Austrian army he didn’t have to join the army because he had a missing finger. In a portrait of him that hangs in the Muzeum Etnograficzne w Krakowie Ethnographic Museum in Krakow, the cut-off finger is clearly evident.
	
He lived by certain principles. He led a hygienic life. He was never allowed to be woken up even if a patient was waiting. He never drank any liquor and because of that he never attended weddings because there was always a temptation.

When a patient was brought to him he listened as to how the accident happened. He would then examine the wound and then skilfully set the bones in their proper location. He even operated on a patient with a broken spine. He told his helpers to hold the patient by his hands, legs and head and then to stretch him as tight as a string, and then he even took off his shoes and used his feet in the procedure.

The son of old Maciej Galuszka-Karol told the story of an accident his father had when carting timber in the forest. On one very steep slope his father fell under the sled and both of his legs were badly mangled. They took him to Józef. With his fingers he set the bones in their place. Father was screaming terribly but Ślopek did not let him go. "Even if you would die in my hands I will not let you go." And he did not, until he finished. He visited Galuszka-Karol's father only twice more and it was enough.

Józef undertook almost impossible surgical task with animals, especially horses. Maciej Galuszka-Karol also tells the following story. “He was working in the forest with his horse. At one point a huge tree fell on the horse and broke both its hind legs. It seemed the end of the horse. They put the horse on the cart and brought it to the barn. I went to get Jozef. He looked at the horse and told us to bring 4 strong rags and some rope. He made holes in each rag and put the horse’s legs through it. We heaved the horse up and hung him from the rafters. Now Jozef put the broken bones in place. He then attached wooden planks and from one leg he hung a rock to make sure the bone would stay in place. The horse hung there for three days, after which the horse's broken legs were healed. Some horses would hang for up to three weeks.”

He was summoned twice to Archduke Charles Stephen of Austria in Żywiec, who was related to Emperor Franz Joseph the First.  He was also summoned to the Emperor’s residence in Vienna. This visit made him famous. Franz Jozef the First had dislocated his leg in the hip when jumping from his horse. The local doctors were unable to help him. Archduke Karol Stefan sent a detachment of the Emperor’s army to bring Józef Ślopek, whom he knew from before. Ślopek put on his best outfit and took a sack of his favorite food with him which his wife Anna had prepared. When he arrived at the Emperor’s castle, the Emperor was lying in bed, surrounded by doctors and his entourage. All were anxious to see the man and see his method of treatment. Ślopek asked His Highness to  let everybody leave the room. When all had left, he took the Emperor’s leg in his hand and he skillfully set it in place. He then asked the Emperor to stand up and walk. The Emperor managed to walk, limping across the room. Ślopek remained in Vienna for 9 days until the Emperor could walk easily. During his stay, he ate the food that he had brought with him. He also food served to Emperor, which they ate together from the same dish. If the Emperor did not eat he also did not touch the food, afraid of being poisoned by jealous doctors. On Ślopek’s departure the Emperor gave him a big banquet in his honor. For his services the Emperor gave him permission to treat people and animals in Galicia (the southern part of Poland under Austrian rule). He also gave him some money and a section of forest in Sopotnia Mala. Emperor’s guard escorted him home with honors.

Ślopek never tried to treat internal ailments. He was respected by the people and he treated rich and poor in the same way. He was not a greedy man. In the cities he accepted monetary donations and in the villages he would receive donations such as eggs, fowl, grain and fruit.

He died on April 24, 1907 and is buried in the church cemetery in Jeleśnia. On his tomb was a stone obelisk with some writing, which unfortunately disappeared.

References 

Józef Juraszek "Ślopek" (1824–1907) - goral z Jelesni, slynny chirurg wiejski specjalizujacy sie w nastawianiu zlamanych kosci. Wyleczyl m.in. cesarza Austrii Franciszka Jozefa I. Tradycje kontynuowala corka Rozalia Polak (1860–1939) z Juszczyny i wnuk Franciszek Polak (1903–1984).
O rodzinie sławnych chirurgów wiejskich: Józefie Juraszku Author: Czesława Goły

1824 births
1907 deaths
People from Żywiec County